Sesi Vôlei Bauru is a women's volleyball team, based in Bauru, São Paulo (state), Brazil.

Team

Season 2021-2022' squad - As of December 2021
 Head coach:  Rubinho Leonaldo

Titles
 Brazilian Cup:
  Champions (1): 2022
 Paulista Championship:
 Champions (1): 2018

References

Brazilian volleyball clubs